Fei-Yue Wang (born November 1961) is a specially appointed state expert, and the Chief Scientist and Founding Director of the State Key Laboratory for Management and Control of Complex Systems of the Chinese Academy of Sciences. He is editor-in-chief of the IEEE Transactions on Computational Social Systems and the IEEE/CAA Journal of Automatica Sinica. Previously he was a Professor of Systems and Industrial Engineering at the University of Arizona, president of the IEEE Intelligent Transportation Systems Society, editor-in-chief of IEEE Transactions on Intelligent Transportation Systems (2009–2016), and editor-in-chief of IEEE Intelligent Systems.

Wang was elected as a Fellow of the IEEE in 2004 "for contributions to intelligent control systems and applications to complex systems". He became a fellow of the American Association for the Advancement of Science and the ASME in 2007. In 2011 he won the Outstanding Research Award of the IEEE Intelligent Transportation Systems Society, and in 2014 he was given the Norbert Wiener Award of the IEEE Systems, Man, and Cybernetics Society "for fundamental contributions to and innovations in the theory and application of intelligent control and management to complex systems."

References

External links

Living people
1961 births
Intelligent transportation systems
Fellow Members of the IEEE
Fellows of the American Association for the Advancement of Science